Madonna and Child with Saint Francis and Saint Clare is a 1492-1495 oil on panel painting by Cima da Conegliano, now in the Metropolitan Museum of Art, in New York.

References

1490s paintings
Paintings of the Madonna and Child by Cima da Conegliano
Paintings of Clare of Assisi
Paintings of Francis of Assisi
Paintings in the collection of the Metropolitan Museum of Art